Felix John Watts (August 4, 1892 - August 17, 1966) was an accomplished inventor with several U.S. patents granted for items such as motion picture projectors, vehicle ignition systems, light switches, locking mechanisms, etc.

Early years
Felix Watts was born in Windsor, Ontario to Samuel Watts and Elizabeth Mills. After the death of his mother Elizabeth (daughter of David Mills, Canadian politician) in 1907, his father moved the family to Port Huron, Michigan.  After high school, Felix attended the University of Michigan where he was an engineering major and captain of the school's international soccer team.

Inventing years
During his years of invention, Felix worked primarily in the electrical and automotive industries and sold many of his inventions to Henry Ford, whom he became close friends with.

Death
Felix died as a result of a stroke in Yale, Michigan a few months after the death of his wife Sarah Dunford.

References
 Motion picture projector patent
 Vehicle ignition system patent

University of Michigan College of Engineering alumni
People from Windsor, Ontario
1892 births
1966 deaths
Canadian emigrants to the United States
People from Port Huron, Michigan
20th-century American inventors